Tim Swaen (born 28 August 1991) is a Dutch field hockey who plays as a defender for Hoofdklasse club Bloemendaal.

Club career
Swaen played in the youth ranks of Deurne, Helmond and Oranje Zwart, where he was deemed not good enough for the first team so he moved to HC Eindhoven. After having played for five years at HC Eindhoven and three years at Tilburg, the defender was picked up in 2017 by Bloemendaal. In the 2021–22 season he won his third league title in a row with Bloemendaal.

International career
Tim Swaen was named in the Oranje squad for the first time in 2021. Later that year he went on to make his international debut during season three of the FIH Pro League. After he was not selected for the 2023 World Cup squad he announced hi retirement from the national team after the tournament.

Honours
Bloemendaal
 Euro Hockey League: 2017–18, 2021, 2022
 Hoofdklasse: 2018–19, 2020–21, 2021–22

Netherlands
 FIH Pro League: 2021–22

References

External links
 
 

1991 births
Living people
Dutch male field hockey players
Male field hockey defenders
HC Bloemendaal players
Men's Hoofdklasse Hockey players
People from Deurne, Netherlands
Oranje Zwart players
Sportspeople from North Brabant